{{Infobox video game
| title = NBA 2K21
| image = NBA 2K21 - Damian Lilliard cover art.jpg
| caption = Cover art for eighth generation consoles featuring Portland Trail Blazers's Damian Lillard
| developer = Visual Concepts
| publisher = 2K Sports
| series = NBA 2K
| platform = 
| release = Microsoft Windows, macOS, Nintendo Switch, PlayStation 4, Xbox One, StadiaXbox Series X/SNovember 10, 2020PlayStation 5November 12, 2020Arcade Edition (Apple Arcade) April 2, 2021
| genre = Sports
| modes = Single-player, multiplayer
}}NBA 2K21' is a 2021 basketball simulation video game that was developed by Visual Concepts and published by 2K Sports. The game is based on the National Basketball Association (NBA) and is the 22nd installment in the NBA 2K franchise, the successor to NBA 2K20, and the predecessor to NBA 2K22.  The game was released on September 4, 2020, for Microsoft Windows, macOS, Nintendo Switch, PlayStation 4, Xbox One, and Google Stadia, and on November 29, 2020 for PlayStation 5 and Xbox Series X/S. Most versions were released to heavy criticism, citing the lack of originality in the gameplay and many microtransactions and bugs.

The NBA 2K21 Arcade Edition was released for Apple Arcade on April 2, 2021.

Promotion
A teaser of the game was released on June 11, 2020, during the PS5 Reveal Event and featured the player model of New Orleans Pelicans' Zion Williamson. It showed a few seconds of pre-alpha, in-engine footage, and showed many effects such as ray-tracing and shadow details. On June 30, 2020, NBA 2K announced Damian Lillard, of the Portland Trail Blazers, would be the cover for the standard edition on the previous-generation consoles. On July 1, 2020, NBA 2K announced Zion Williamson as the cover athlete for the standard edition of the next-generation consoles. The last covers were released on July 2, 2020, honoring the late Kobe Bryant. The demo for the game was released on August 24, 2020

Gameplay

 MyCareer 
MyCareer, a major part of the series, returns as one of the available game modes. MyCareer is a career mode in which the player creates their own customizable basketball player and plays through their basketball career. Players may make a male or female player, although female player creation is exclusively available on next-gen consoles. The Neighborhood also returns to MyCareer, as 2K Beach, in which players can customize their wardrobe, get haircuts and tattoos, and purchase boosts. They can also do workouts and run drills to improve their character's attributes at their current team's practice facility. Progress in MyCareer may not carry over across generations, due to some changes made exclusively for next-gen.

 MyTeam 
MyTeam is another available game mode which is also a major part of 2K.

 Ninth generation changes 
In the next-generation release for the game, The MyCareer online staple The Neighborhood mode was rebranded into The City with the return of affiliations from NBA 2K16. Players start in Rookieville where they play similarly low-leveled players before they can choose an affiliation to enter The City. MyRep, the level system exclusive to The City mode, is shared across all MyPlayer builds, so players only have to level up out of Rookieville once for all their characters. Once a player levels out of Rookieville, they are automatically assigned without choice to one of four of The City's affiliations, ranging from the North Side Knights, South City Vipers, Beasts of the East, and the Western Wildcats. Players are free to switch their affiliation, however they are penalized for doing so by their level being reset down to Pro 1; same level the player was from leaving Rookieville. Although the player can play in affiliations that they are not a member of, there is a penalty by reducing the amount of experience gained in matches for their MyRep level. Players can participate in quests given by NPCs, which are either single-player 3v3 games against famous basketball players, or playing games against other MyPlayers in The City. The rewards are typically Virtual Currency (VC) and customizations.

Every affiliation has elections for a Mayor, which are typically community influencers who are responsible for making videos that display in-game, court designs, in-game playlists, design of murals, and uniform selections. Each mayoral term lasts 6 weeks.

 Franchise mode NBA 2K21 features both MyLeague and MyGM from previous games, where the player can take the helm of a franchise and fully simulate an NBA season while making trades, drafting, and playing games with their teams. Compared to prior titles, eighth-generation console releases of NBA 2K21 were left with little changes for their staple franchise modes, MyLeague and MyGM. Outside of roster changes, the main changes focuses with MyLeague Online where certain users can be given different admin control. WNBA teams were also given more representation as players were now able to play through a whole season with all 12 teams.

 Ninth generation changes 
In the game's Xbox Series X/S and PS5 release, MyGM and MyLeague were combined and rebranded into MyNBA. Instead of the role-playing aspects such as cutscenes, player morale, and tasks being locked solely to MyGM, they are now individually toggleable under role-playing elements before one starts MyNBA. NBA G League games are also playable as well, however playoffs and the championship for the NBA G League are not featured. A boom/bust system was also revamped, giving more unpredictability to draft prospects and young players in terms of how their career will turnout.

ReceptionNBA 2K21 received "mixed or average" reviews from critics, according to review aggregator Metacritic, and "generally favorable reviews" on the ninth-generation consoles.

Michael Higham from GameSpot gave the game a score of 6-out-of-10. He states "NBA 2K21 shows that the lone basketball sim we have now has largely stagnated. It's a full package, for sure, but one that demonstrates little-to-no motivation to meaningfully improve upon itself. That doesn't take away from the strong foundation that makes NBA 2K a fun and rewarding time. However, when you go through the same grind and the same process with only superficial changes, you just get burnt out faster than years prior."

Ben Vollmer from IGN gave the game a score of 6 out of 10, stating "More of the same isn't good enough anymore, especially when it includes such obtrusive microtransactions." Vollmer also says "At the same time, it's a shame that 2K's focus isn't on the fun you can have on the court, but instead the money that can be extracted from your wallet off of the court in the MyCareer and MyTeam modes, whist aren't fun to grind through without paying. Maybe the new set of consoles on the horizon will bring a fresh start for the NBA 2K franchise, but right now I feel more pessimistic about the series’ future than ever."

The PlayStation 4 version of NBA 2K21'' sold 8,541 physical copies within its first week on sale in Japan, making it the seventh bestselling retail game of the week. The game had sold more than 8 million copies by the end of December 2020.

It was nominated in the category of Best Sports/Racing Game at The Game Awards 2020.

References

External links

2020 video games
2K Sports games
Multiplayer and single-player video games
NBA 2K
Nintendo Switch games
PlayStation 4 games
PlayStation 4 Pro enhanced games
PlayStation 5 games
Stadia games
Take-Two Interactive games
Video games developed in the United States
Video games set in 2020
Video games set in 2021
Windows games
Xbox One games
Xbox Series X and Series S games